The Women's sprint event of the FIS Nordic World Ski Championships 2015 was held on 19 February 2015.

Results

Qualification
The qualification was held at 13:00.

Quarterfinals
The quarterfinals were started at 15:15.

Quarterfinal 1

Quarterfinal 2

Quarterfinal 3

Quarterfinal 4

Quarterfinal 5

Semifinals
The semifinals were started at 16:25.

Semifinal 1

Semifinal 2

Final
The final was held at 17:00.

References

Women's sprint
2015 in Swedish women's sport